The International Federation of Sport Climbing (IFSC) is the international governing body for the sport of competitive climbing, which consists of the disciplines lead climbing, speed climbing, and bouldering. It was founded in Frankfurt on 27 January 2007 by 48 member federations and is a continuation of the International Council for Competition Climbing, which had been in existence from 1997 to 2007 and was a part of the Union Internationale des Associations d'Alpinisme (UIAA).

Due to the 2022 Russian invasion of Ukraine, the IFSC suspended the Russian and Belarusian federations and canceled all events in Russia in 2022.

Competitions
The major competitions organized by the IFSC are:

World Cup

The IFSC Climbing World Cup is a series of competitions held annually. The athletes compete in three disciplines: lead, bouldering, and speed. The number of competitions and venues vary from year to year. The first World Cup was held under the auspices of UIAA in 1989, World Cups were held under the auspices of IFSC from 2007.

World Championship

The IFSC Climbing World Championship is a competition held biennially. This event determines the male and female world champions in the three disciplines of sport climbing lead, bouldering and speed as well as in para-climbing.

World Youth Championship

The IFSC World Youth Championship is a competition held annually. This event determines the male and female world youth champions in three disciplines: lead, speed, and bouldering. For each discipline, the athletes are grouped in three age groups: Youth B, Youth A and Juniors.

European Championship

The IFSC European Championship is a competition held biennially in years when World Championships are not held. This event determines the male and female European champions in the three disciplines of sport climbing lead, bouldering, and speed.

European Youth Cup

The IFSC European Youth Cup is a series of competitions held annually. Athletes compete in three disciplines: lead, speed, and bouldering and are grouped into three age groups: Youth B, Youth A, and Juniors.

Presidents
2007- : Marco Maria Scolaris

Members
In the following tables are listed the members of the national federations:

Full members

Continental members

Regional

Observers

See also 
 IFSC Climbing World Championships
 IFSC Climbing World Cup
 IFSC Climbing European Championships

References

External links
 
 
 

Climbing organizations
Sport Climbing
Organisations based in Turin
Sport climbing
Sport in Turin
Sports governing bodies in Italy
Sports organizations established in 2007